The Schwartz company was founded in 1841 to sell coffee in Nova Scotia, Canada. In 1984 McCormick & Company took over the brand, thereby becoming the world's largest producer of herbs, spices, and seasonings.

Started in Halifax, Canada, by William Henry Schwartz, the son of a German baker of the same name from Amsterdam, the company grew as a family operation. Son W. E. Schwartz added pure spices with the purchase of a spice mill in 1880. By the 1930s the company was selling in more than fifty countries. Its slogan was "Say Schwartz and be Sure" and by the 1950s their current "S" trademark was in use. Subsequent changes in ownership have resulted in the business now being represented solely by the brand.

References

External links
 Official Schwartz Website
 https://web.archive.org/web/20120225072814/http://www.lib.uwo.ca/programs/companyinformationcanada/ccc-whschwartz.htm
 Tales of the Indies. W. E. Schwartz. Herald Printing House: Halifax. 1899.

Food manufacturers of the United States
1984 mergers and acquisitions
McCormick & Company brands